Justinian Tamusuza (born 1951) is a Ugandan composer of contemporary classical music.

His music combines elements of traditional Ugandan music and Western music. He is best known for his first string quartet, which was included by the Kronos Quartet on their 1992 CD Pieces of Africa, which contains music by seven African composers. His music has also been performed by the Imani Winds.

Tamusuza was born in Kibisi. His early training was in Baganda traditional music. His early instructors included the Reverend Anthony Okelo and Kevin Volans at Queen's University Belfast in Belfast, Northern Ireland. He received his doctorate in composition at Northwestern University, where he studied with Alan Stout.

He has taught at Makerere University in Kampala, Uganda, as well as at Northwestern University.

His music is published by International Opus.

References

External links
Justinian Tamusuza official site
Justinian Tamusuza page from International Opus site

Ugandan composers
1951 births
Living people
20th-century classical composers
Northwestern University alumni
Alumni of Queen's University Belfast
People from Kampala
Northwestern University faculty
Academic staff of Makerere University
Male classical composers
20th-century male musicians